

Current electoral districts

 Athabasca (1934)
 Arm River (2016)
 Batoche (2003)
 Biggar-Sask Valley (2016)
 Cannington (1995)
 Canora-Pelly (1995)
 Carrot River Valley (1995)
 Cumberland (1975)
 Cut Knife-Turtleford (2003)
 Cypress Hills (1995)
 Estevan (1975)
 Humboldt-Watrous (2016)
 Indian Head-Milestone (1995)
 Kelvington-Wadena (1975)
 Kindersley (1975)
 Last Mountain-Touchwood (1975)

 Lloydminster (1995)
 Lumsden-Morse (2016)
 Martensville-Warman (2016)
 Meadow Lake (1934)
 Melfort (2003)
 Melville-Saltcoats (2003)
 Moose Jaw North (1995)
 Moose Jaw Wakamow (1991)
 Moosomin (1905)
 Prince Albert Carlton (1991)
 Prince Albert Northcote (1991)
 Regina Coronation Park (1995)
 Regina Douglas Park (2003)
 Regina Elphinstone-Centre (2003)
 Regina Gardiner Park (2016)

 Regina Lakeview (1995)
 Regina Northeast (1995)
 Regina Pasqua (2016)
 Regina Rochdale (2016)
 Regina Rosemont (2003)
 Regina University (2016)
 Regina Walsh Acres (2003)
 Regina Wascana Plains (1991)
 Rosetown-Elrose (2003)
 Rosthern-Shellbrook (2003)
 Saskatchewan Rivers (1995)
 Saskatoon Centre (2003)
 Saskatoon Churchill-Wildwood (2016)
 Saskatoon Eastview (1995)
 Saskatoon Fairview (1982)

 Saskatoon Meewasin (1995)
 Saskatoon Northwest (1995)
 Saskatoon Nutana (1975)
 Saskatoon Riversdale (1967)
 Saskatoon Silverspring-Sutherland (2016)
 Saskatoon Southeast (1991)
 Saskatoon Stonebridge-Dakota (2016)
 Saskatoon University (2016)
 Saskatoon Westview (2016)
 Saskatoon Willowgrove (2016)
 Swift Current (1908)
 The Battlefords (2003)
 Weyburn-Big Muddy (1995)
 Wood River (1995)
 Yorkton (1905)

Former electoral districts

Provincial Ridings

 Arm River (1908–2003)
 Arm River-Watrous (2003-2016)
 Assiniboia-Bengough (1971–1975)
 Assiniboia-Gravelbourg (1975–1995)
 Athabasca (1908–1917)
 Batoche (1905–1908)
 Battleford (1905–1917)
 Battleford-Cut Knife (1995–2003)
 Bengough (1917–1971)
 Bengough-Milestone (1975–1995)
 Biggar (1912–1995)
 Biggar (2003-2016)
 Bromhead (1934–1938)
 Cannington (1905–1975)
 Canora (1908–1934)
 Canora (1938–1995)
 Cumberland (1912–1934)
 Cumberland (1938–1964)
 Cut Knife (1917–1964)
 Cut Knife-Lloydminster (1964–1995)
 Cypress (1917–1934)
 Duck Lake (1908–1912)
 Eagle Creek (1912–1917)
 Elrose (1917–1975)
 Estevan (1908–1934)
 Francis (1908–1938)
 Gravelbourg (1921–1975)
 Grenfell (1905–1908)
 Gull Lake (1912–1917)
 Gull Lake (1934–1952)
 Hanley (1908–1975)
 Happyland (1917–1934)
 Humboldt (1905-2016)
 Île-à-la-Crosse (1917–1934)
 Indian Head-Wolseley (1975–1995)
 Jack Fish Lake (1917–1934)
 Kelsey (1952–1971)
 Kelsey-Tisdale (1975–1995)
 Kelvington (1934–1975)
 Kerrobert (1912–1938)
 Kerrobert-Kindersley (1938–1975)
 Kindersley (1912–1938)
 Kinistino (1905–1971)
 Kinistino (1975–1995)
 Last Mountain (1908–1975)
 Lloydminster (1908–1934)
 Lumsden (1905–1908)

 Lumsden (1912–1975)
 Maple Creek (1905–1995)
 Martensville (2003-2016)
 Melfort (1912–1952)
 Melfort (1975–1995)
 Melfort-Kinistino (1971–1975)
 Melfort-Tisdale (1952–1971)
 Melfort-Tisdale (1995–2003)
 Melville (1934–2003)
 Milestone (1908–1975)
 Moose Jaw (1905–1908)
 Moose Jaw City (1905–1967)
 Moose Jaw County (1908–1938)
 Moose Jaw North (1967–1991)
 Moose Jaw Palliser (1991–1995)
 Moose Jaw South (1967–1991)
 Moose Mountain (1908–1921)
 Morse (1912–1995)
 Nipawin (1952–1995)
 North Battleford (1908–1917)
 North Battleford (1995–2003)
 North Qu'Appelle (1905–1934)
 Notukeu (1917–1938)
 Notukeu-Willow Bunch (1938–1975)
 Pelly (1908–1995)
 Pheasant Hills (1908–1938)
 Pinto Creek (1912–1917)
 Pipestone (1908–1934)
 Prince Albert (1905–1908)
 Prince Albert (1917–1967)
 Prince Albert (1975–1991)
 Prince Albert City (1905–1917)
 Prince Albert County (1908–1912)
 Prince Albert-Duck Lake (1975–1991)
 Prince Albert East (1971–1975)
 Prince Albert East-Cumberland (1967–1971)
 Prince Albert West (1967–1975)
 Qu'Appelle (1975–1982)
 Qu'Appelle-Lumsden (1982–1995)
 Qu'Appelle-Wolseley (1934–1975)
 Quill Lakes (1975–1995)
 Quill Plains (1912–1917)
 Redberry (1905–1934)
 Redberry (1938–1995)
 Redberry Lake (1995–2003)
 Regina Albert North (1991–1995)

 Regina Albert Park (1971–1975)
 Regina Albert South (1991–1995)
 Regina Centre (1967–1991)
 Regina Centre (1995–2003)
 Regina Dewdney (1991-2016)
 Regina Churchill Downs (1991–1995)
 Regina City (1905–1964)
 Regina County (1908–1912)
 Regina East (1964–1967)
 Regina Elphinstone (1975–2003)
 Regina Hillsdale (1991–1995)
 Regina Lake Centre (1991–1995)
 Regina Lakeview (1971–1991)
 Regina North (1964–1967)
 Regina North (1982–1991)
 Regina North East (1967–1991)
 Regina North West (1967–1995)
 Regina Qu'Appelle Valley (1995-2016)
 Regina Rosemont (1975–1995)
 Regina Sherwood (1995–2003)
 Regina South (1964–1971)
 Regina South (1975–1991)
 Regina South (1995-2016)
 Regina South East (1967–1971)
 Regina South West (1967–1971)
 Regina Victoria (1975–2003)
 Regina Wascana (1971–1991)
 Regina West (1964–1967)
 Regina Whitmore Park (1971–1975)
 Rosetown (1912–1975)
 Rosetown-Biggar (1995–2003)
 Rosetown-Elrose (1975–1995)
 Rosthern (1905–2003)
 Saltcoats (1905–1934)
 Saltcoats (1938–2003)
 Saskatoon (1905–1908)
 Saskatoon Broadway (1991–1995)
 Saskatoon Buena Vista (1975–1982)
 Saskatoon Centre (1975–1991)
 Saskatoon City (1908–1967)
 Saskatoon City Park (1971–1975)
 Saskatoon City Park-University (1967–1971)
 Saskatoon County (1908–1934)
 Saskatoon Eastview (1975–1991)
 Saskatoon Eastview-Haultain (1991–1995)
 Saskatoon Idylwyld (1991–2003)

 Saskatoon Greystone (1991-2016)
 Saskatoon Massey Place (2003-2016)
 Saskatoon Mayfair (1967–1991)
 Saskatoon Mount Royal (1995–2003)
 Saskatoon Nutana Centre (1967–1975)
 Saskatoon Nutana South (1967–1975)
 Saskatoon River Heights (1991–1995)
 Saskatoon Silver Springs (2003-2016)
 Saskatoon South (1982–1991)
 Saskatoon Sutherland (1975–1991)
 Saskatoon Sutherland (1995-2016)
 Saskatoon Sutherland-University (1991–1995)
 Saskatoon University (1971–1975)
 Saskatoon University (1982–1991)
 Saskatoon Westmount (1975–1995)
 Saskatoon Wildwood (1991–1995)
 Shaunavon (1934–1938)
 Shaunavon (1952–1995)
 Shellbrook (1912–1982)
 Shellbrook-Spiritwood (1995–2003)
 Shellbrook-Torch River (1982–1995)
 Souris (1905–1934)
 Souris-Cannington (1975–1995)
 Souris-Estevan (1934–1975)
 South Qu'Appelle (1905–1934)
 South Regina (1905–1908)
 The Battlefords (1917–1995)
 Thunder Creek (1912–1938)
 Thunder Creek (1975–2016)
 Tisdale (1917–1952)
 Tisdale-Kelsey (1971–1975)
 Torch River (1938–1952)
 Touchwood (1908–1975)
 Tramping Lake (1912–1917)
 Turtleford (1917–1995)
 Vonda (1908–1934)
 Wadena (1908–1975)
 Watrous (1934–1975)
 Watrous (1995–2003)
 Weyburn (1908–1995)
 Whitewood (1905–1908)
 Wilkie (1917–1995)
 Willow Bunch (1912–1938)
 Wolseley (1905–1908)
 Wolseley (1921–1934)
 Wynyard (1917–1934)

Active Service Voters
 Active Service Voters (1917–1921)
France and Belgium
Great Britain
 Active Service Voters (1944–1948)
Area No. 1 (Great Britain)
Area No. 2 (Countries bordering on the Mediterranean Sea)
Area No. 3 (Canada outside of Saskatchewan or in Newfoundland)

See also
Electoral district (Canada)
Canadian provincial electoral districts
List of Saskatchewan general elections

References
Elections Saskatchewan
Saskatchewan Archives Board: Saskatchewan Executive and Legislative Directory

 
Electoral districts, Provincial
Saskatchewan